Post is a city in and the county seat of Garza County, Texas, United States. Its population was 5,376 at the 2010 census.

History
Post is located on the edge of the caprock escarpment of the Llano Estacado, the southeastern edge of the Great Plains. It is at the crossroads of U.S. Routes 84 and 380.

The land belonged to John Bunyan Slaughter, as it was on his U Lazy S Ranch. In 1906, Slaughter sold it to C. W. Post, the breakfast cereal manufacturer, who founded "Post City" as a utopian colonizing venture in 1907. Post devised the community as a model town.  He purchased  of ranchland and established the Double U Company to manage the town's construction. The company built trim houses and numerous structures, which included the Algerita Hotel, a gin, and a textile plant. They planted trees along every street and prohibited alcoholic beverages and brothels. The Double U Company rented and sold farms and houses to settlers. A post office began in a tent during the year of Post City's founding, being established (with the name Post) July 18, 1907, with Frank L. Curtis as first postmaster. Two years later, the town had a school, a bank, and a newspaper, the  Post City Post, the same name as the daily in St. Louis, Missouri. The Garza County paper today is called the Post Dispatch. The railroad reached the town in 1910. The town changed its name to "Post" when it incorporated in 1914, the year of C. W. Post's death. By then, Post had a population of 1000, 10 retail businesses, a dentist, a physician, a sanitarium, and Baptist, Methodist, and Presbyterian churches.

From 1910 to 1913, Post experimented with attempts at rainmaking. Explosives were detonated in the atmosphere at timed intervals. Precipitation records, however, showed that the efforts failed.

The C. W. Post estate pledged $75,000, and the town raised $35,000 in 1916 to bid unsuccessfully to become the site of the proposed West Texas Agricultural and Mechanical College.

Postex Cotton Mills began production in 1913 with 250 employees. When the Post interests sold the business in 1945 to Ely and Walker Dry Goods Company of St. Louis, the plant was producing six million yards of cloth a year and employed 375 workers, who manufactured Postex cotton sheets and Garza pillow cases. Ely and Walker sold Postex in 1955 to Burlington Industries, the world's largest textile manufacturer at that time. By 1973, the company employed 450 persons. The mill has since closed.

Oilfield service companies have been important to the economy, as have farming and ranching. In 1989, Post had two libraries, a hospital, a nursing home, an airport, the Post Dispatch (founded 1926), and 90 businesses. The population reached 3,400 in 1928, declined to 2,000 in 1940, and increased to 3,100 during the 1950s. With the development of the local oil industry, the town's population attained its highest level of 4,800 in 1964. The 1980 census showed a population of 3,864, but by 1988, the Texas Almanac reported 4,162. In 1990, the population was 3,768.

Many ranchers and civic boosters live in Garza County, among them Giles McCrary, a former mayor, who until his death in 2011, operated the OS Museum, a hybrid of exhibits from both the American West and Asia, which are changed three times per year. Two baseball fields in Post are named for former resident Norm Cash.

Geography

Post is located on the rolling plains at the foot of the Llano Estacado at  (33.191789, –101.380432).

Climate

According to the Köppen climate classification, Post has a semiarid climate. According to other climatic maps, it falls in a subtropical climate (Köppen: Cfa). Surpassing the 100° meridian, it is the city more to the west in the USA with such categorization. In any case, the city suffers influence from both sides, being the transition from a humid to dry environment in the subtropics.

Major roads and highways
 U.S. Highway 84
 U.S. Highway 380
 State Highway 207
 Farm to Market Road 669
 Farm to Market Road 651

Demographics

2020 census

As of the 2020 United States census, there were 4,790 people, 1,278 households, and 911 families residing in the city.

2000 census
As of the census of 2000,  3,708 people, 1,243 households, and 873 families resided in the city. The population density was 988.8 people/sq mi (381.8/km). The 1,419 housing units averaged 378.4/sq mi (146.1/km). The racial makeup of the city was 51.54% White, 5.47% African American, 0.24% Native American, 0.11% Asian, 18.69% from other races, and 2.91% from two or more races. About 42.64% of the population was Hispanic or Latino of any race.

Of the 1,243 households, 34.8% had children under the age of 18 living with them, 53.5% were married couples living together, 13.0% had a female householder with no husband present, and 29.7% were not families. About 26.6% of all households were made up of individuals, and 13.9% had someone living alone who was 65 or older. The average household size was 2.62 and the average family size was 3.17.

In the city, the age distribution was as 27.5% under 18, 8.8% from 18 to 24, 29.4% from 25 to 44, 20.0% from 45 to 64, and 14.4% who were 65 or older. The median age was 34 years. For every 100 females, there were 114.5 males. For every 100 females age 18 and over, there were 115.8 males.

The median income for a household in the city was $25,034, and for a family was $29,135. Males had a median income of $26,318 versus $17,266 for females. The per capita income for the city was $11,113. About 23.0% of families and 27.8% of the population were below the poverty line, including 34.2% of those under age 18 and 25.9% of those age 65 or over.

Post is served by two weekly newspapers, nearby (Lamesa) stations  KJJT (FM) and KPET (AM), and the various Lubbock radio and TV stations. KPOS(AM) was licensed to Post, but was deleted (license turned into FCC) for cancellation in 1998 when the sister FM was upgraded to cover Slaton and the Lubbock area. KSSL (FM)is licensed to Post, but operates primarily from offices and studios in Slaton.

Education
The City of Post is served by the Post Independent School District and home to the Post High School Antelopes.

Gallery

See also

Close City, Texas, the original site of Post City, Texas
Double Mountain Fork Brazos River
Justiceburg, Texas
Llano Estacado
West Texas

References

External links

Photos of the Llano Estacado

Cities in Garza County, Texas
Cities in Texas
County seats in Texas
Populated places established in 1907